Jamie Bethany Loftus is a writer, stand up alternative comedian, animator, podcast co-host, and actor based in Los Angeles. She is known for her solo work, such as her one-woman shows I Lost My Virginity on August 15, 2010 and Boss, Whom is Girl. She has also written comedic articles, and written and starred in video content, for media sites such as Adult Swim, Comedy Central, Paste, and Super Deluxe. She was nominated for an Emmy for her work on Robot Chicken in 2020.

Along with fellow comedian Caitlin Durante, she co-hosts The Bechdel Cast, a weekly podcast about the representation of women in film. She has also produced and hosted limited run podcasts for iHeartRadio: My Year in Mensa, Lolita Podcast, Aack Cast, and Ghost Church.

Career
Loftus's first job out of college was at The Boston Globe. She was fired from the role when she tweeted after a standup set, “crushing so hard at an open mic that I cum bloods.” A local radio show referenced this as “the end of journalism.”

Her often absurdist humor, sometimes bordering on performance art and documented for websites such as Paste, has included pretending to date an American Girl doll, joining Mensa as a joke, selling "Shrek nudes" with her body painted green to raise money for Planned Parenthood, and attempting to eat a copy of David Foster Wallace's Infinite Jest.

She has written and performed several one-woman live shows. One is called I Lost My Virginity on August 15, 2010. Another show, Boss, Whom is Girl, was workshopped at the Lyric Hyperion Theatre in Los Angeles. It was then brought to the United Kingdom with shows in London and at the 2019 Edinburgh Fringe. Its run at the Fringe was recommended by newspapers such as The Guardian, The Sunday Times, and The Daily Express.

In April 2018, a three-part web series she wrote and starred in, Irrational Fears was released on Comedy Central Digital.

In summer 2018, she was hired as a writer for the long-running Adult Swim show Robot Chicken.

On January 1, 2020, Loftus released a four-part podcast entitled My Year in Mensa that chronicles the events surrounding her applying to join Mensa for the purpose of writing a series of humorous articles for Paste.

On November 23, 2020, Loftus began releasing a new 10-part podcast entitled Lolita Podcast about the pop cultural imprint, misinterpretations, and adaptations of Vladimir Nabokov's novel Lolita.

On June 28, 2021, she began releasing another podcast series, this time about the comic Cathy, titled Aack Cast.

She is also a canvasser for the Democratic Socialists of America.

In May 2023 a book written by Loftus entitled Raw Dog: The Naked Truth About Hot Dogs will be published by Macmillan.

Credits

Live credits
 Death Wish – Writer/Performer/Director (2014)
 Basketball City – Writer (2015)
 Bad Art – Writer/Performer (2015)
 I Lost My Virginity on August 15, 2010 – Writer/Performer (2017)
 The Hacker Who Codes – Writer/Performer (2018)
 Boss, Whom is Girl – Writer/Performer (2019)
 Jamie Loftus, Jamie Loftus – Writer/Performer (2020)

Film/Television credits
 Boston PD: Zamboni Crimes Division – Writer/Animator/Voice Actor (2016)
 Rat Teens – Writer/Animator/Voice Actor (2017)
 Funny or Die Presents – Actor (2017)
 Super Deluxe – Writer/Actor (2017–18)
 Irrational Fears – Writer/Actor (2018)
 Robot Chicken – Writer/Voice Actor (2018-2021)
 All About Nina – Comedy Consultant/Actor (2018)
 Human Kind Of – Writer/Voice Actor (2018)
 The New Negroes – Actor (2019)
 Magical Girl Friendship Squad - Writer/Voice Actor (2020)
Teenage Euthanasia - Writer (2021)

Limited Series Podcasts
 My Year in Mensa (2020)
 Lolita Podcast (2020)
 Aack Cast (2021)
 Ghost Church (2022)

Bibliography
Raw Dog: The Naked Truth About Hot Dogs (2023)

References

External links
 
 The Bechdel Cast website

Comedians from California
Comedians from Massachusetts
American women television writers
American women comedians
American television writers
Members of the Democratic Socialists of America
California socialists
Massachusetts socialists
Living people
1993 births
21st-century American women